This is a list of Telugu-language films produced in the year 2014.

Box office

January–June

July–December

Notable deaths

References

2014
Telugu
Telugu